Robert Allen O'Brien (born April 23, 1949) is a former pitcher in Major League Baseball. He pitched in 14 games for the Los Angeles Dodgers during the 1971 season, including four starts and one shutout.

He played college ball at three different schools, Fresno City College, Texas A&M University and the University of Arizona and was drafted 4 times, by the Detroit Tigers in the 1968 January Draft, by the San Diego Padres in the 1968 June Draft and by the Dodgers in the 1969 January Draft and 1969 June Draft.

O'Brien was acquired along with Doyle Alexander, Sergio Robles and Royle Stillman by the Baltimore Orioles from the Dodgers for Frank Robinson and Pete Richert at the Winter Meetings on December 2, 1971.
 
He is now a math teacher.

References

External links

1949 births
Living people
Major League Baseball pitchers
Fresno City Rams baseball players
Los Angeles Dodgers players
Baseball players from Pennsylvania
Ogden Dodgers players
Spokane Indians players
Rochester Red Wings players
Asheville Tourists players
Tacoma Twins players
Albuquerque Dukes players
Texas A&M Aggies baseball players
Arizona Wildcats baseball players